Motoko is a feminine Japanese given name.

Possible writings
 もとこ hiragana
 素子 "unadorned, plain, undecorated, child"
 元子 "origin, child"
 基子 "fundamental, child"
 資子 "resourceful, child"

People with the name
 Motoko Arai (新井 素子), Japanese writer
 Hani Motoko (羽仁 もと子), the first female Japanese journalist
 Motoko Hirotsu (広津 素子), Japanese politician
 Motoko Obayashi (素子), a Japanese volleyball player
 Motoko Ishii (幹子), a Japanese lighting designer
 Motoko Fujimoto (索子), a Japanese softball player
 Motoko Fujishiro Huthwaite (1927–2020), American teacher
 Motoko Katakura (1937-2013), Japanese anthropologist 
 Motoko Kumai (統子, born 1970), a Japanese voice actress
, Japanese actress and striptease performer

Fictional characters
 Motoko Aoyama (素子), a character in the Love Hina series
 Motoko Kusanagi (素子), protagonist of the Ghost in the Shell series
 Motoko Minagawa (素子), a character in the Fruits Basket series
 Motoko-chan (もと子), the main character of the Super Famicom video game Motoko-chan no Wonder Kitchen
 Motoko Meada (前田 元子), a character in the Shiki series

Japanese feminine given names